The men's synchronized 10 metre platform competition at the 2018 Asian Games took place on 29 August 2018 at the Gelora Bung Karno Aquatic Stadium in Gelora, Central Jakarta, Indonesia.

Schedule
All times are Western Indonesia Time (UTC+07:00)

Results

References

External links
Official website

Men's synchronized 10 metre platform